JAL (Just Another Language) is a Pascal-like programming language and compiler that generates executable code for PIC microcontrollers.  It is a free-format language with a compiler that runs on Linux, MS-Windows and MS-DOS (OSX support). It is configurable and extendable through the use of libraries and can even be combined with PIC assembly language.

History
JAL was originally created by Wouter van Ooijen and released as free software under the GNU General Public License in 2003. In 2006, Stef Mientki initiated the development of a new version, JALV2, which was programmed by Kyle York and beta tested by an international user group.

Sample code
 -- JAL 2.3
 include 16f877_bert--define the variables
 var byte resist--define the pins
 pin_a0_direction = input--variable resistor
 pin_d7_direction = input--switch
 pin_c2_direction = output--pwm led--enable pulse width modulation
 PWM_init_frequency (true, true)
 
 forever loop--convert analog on a0 to digital
    resist = ADC_read_low_res(0)
 
    -- run measurement through flash memory
    program_eeprom_write(2000,resist)
    program_eeprom_read(2000,resist)
 
    -- run measurement through data memory
    data_eeprom_write(10,resist)
    data_eeprom_read(10,resist)
 
    -- if the switch is pressed return random value
    if pin_d7 == high then
       resist = random_byte
    end if--send resistance to PC
    serial_sw_write(resist)
    delay_100ms(1)
    -- set actual PWM duty cycle
    PWM_Set_DutyCycle (resist, resist)
 
 end loop

References

External links
JALv2 Compiler home page
Open Source JAL Libraries
JAL Homepage

Procedural programming languages
Programming languages created in 2003